The following are the winners of the 1st annual (1974) Origins Award, presented at Origins Game Fair 1975:

The awards were the "brainchild of Canadian hobbyist John Mansfield." Originally the awards were the Origins Awards but were informally known as the Charles Roberts Awards and it was only in 1988 that Charles Roberts officially agreed to let his name be used.

Charles Roberts Awards

Adventure Gaming Hall of Fame Inductee
 Don Turnbull

References

External links
 Charles S. Roberts Awards 1974: winners and nominees

1974 awards in the United States
 
1974 awards